New Thebes is a city in Luxor Governorate, Egypt.

Populated places in Luxor Governorate
New towns in Egypt
Cities in Egypt